The Pozuzo River is a river in Peru. It has a general course south to north. This basin departmental limit Huánuco is understood between the Yanachaka mountain range to the east and the line - Pasco, for the north-east the line provincial limit Oxapampa - Cerro de Pasco for the south-west.

More information Pozuzo Information

Length: 20 km
Area: 6095 km²
I modulate: 442.8 m³/s

Rivers of Peru
Rivers of Huánuco Region
Rivers of Pasco Region